Walu may refer to:

Walu, Burma
Hawaiian term for escolar, a fish
WaLu Martial arts, a Chinese Martial Arts System